Events from the year 1760 in Russia

Incumbents
 Monarch – Elizabeth I

Events

Births

 Julia Adlerberg
 Mikhail Bulatov
 Fedor Mikhailovich Dubiansky
 Christine Rakhmanov

Deaths

References

1760 in Russia
Years of the 18th century in the Russian Empire